is a Japanese speed skater who competed in the 1984 Winter Olympics.

He was born in Kushiro, Hokkaidō.

In 1984 he won the silver medal in the 500 metres event. In the 1000 metres competition he finished 31st.

External links
 

1962 births
Japanese male speed skaters
Speed skaters at the 1984 Winter Olympics
Olympic speed skaters of Japan
Medalists at the 1984 Winter Olympics
Olympic medalists in speed skating
Olympic silver medalists for Japan
Speed skaters at the 1986 Asian Winter Games
People from Kushiro, Hokkaido
Living people
20th-century Japanese people